Alexander L. (Sasha) Klibanov is associate professor in the Division of Cardiovascular Medicine and Department of Biomedical Engineering at the University of Virginia. He specializes in the study of ultrasound and medical imaging techniques.

Targeted microbubbles 
Dr. Klibanov designed targeted microbubbles in 1997  that launched a new medical imaging modality, named molecular ultrasonography or ultrasound molecular imaging. Potential clinical applications are expected in cancer screening to detect malignant tumors at their earliest stage of appearance; with  intravenous injection of targeted microbubbles that specifically bind to tumoral microvessels by targeting biomolecular cancer expression (overexpression of certain biomolecules occurs during neo-angiogenesis or inflammation processes).

References

Sources
University of Virginia bio page of Kilbanov

University of Virginia School of Medicine faculty
Living people
Year of birth missing (living people)